This is a list of international presidential trips made by Petro Poroshenko, the 5th President of Ukraine.
Also, Petro Poroshenko has made two visits as a president-elect, before his inauguration. On 4 June 2014, Petro Poroshenko has traveled to Warsaw to celebrate 25th anniversary of Poland's liberation. On 6 June 2014, Petro Poroshenko has traveled to France as a personal guest of President François Hollande at the ceremonies for the 70th anniversary of D-Day in Bénouville, Normandy.

Summary of international trips

2014
The following international trips were made by President Petro Poroshenko in 2014:

Cancelled visits during 2014

2015

The following international trips were made by President Petro Poroshenko in 2015:

Cancelled visits during 2015

2016
The following international trips were made by President Petro Poroshenko in 2016:

2017

The following international trips were made by President Petro Poroshenko in 2017:

2018

2019

Multilateral meetings participated in by Poroshenko

References

External links
 President of Ukraine, official website News - Current Events
 President of Ukraine, official website Photo gallery - Foreign visits

Lists of diplomatic trips
Lists of 21st-century trips
2014 in international relations
2015 in international relations
2016 in international relations
State visits by Ukrainian leaders
Ukraine diplomacy-related lists
Diplomatic visits by heads of state
Trips